Andrew Osenga is an American singer-songwriter and rock musician. He also writes, produces, engineers and plays guitar for other artists. Formerly the lead singer of The Normals, who broke up in 2003 for financial and family reasons, Osenga currently pursues a solo career in which he has released four albums. He is also a former member of the band Caedmon's Call; he had taken over as vocalist/guitarist while Derek Webb was gone from the band. In 2006, Osenga co-founded the Square Peg Alliance along with 12 other independent Nashville artists.
In 2014, Osenga took a job with Capitol Records in A&R for their Christian music division.

Discography

The Normals
Better Than This (1998)
Coming To Life (2000)
A Place Where You Belong (2002)
Happy Christmas Vol. 2 (1999 compilation)

Caedmon's Call
Share the Well (2004)
In the Company of Angels II: The World Will Sing (2006)
Overdressed (2007)

Solo
Photographs (2002)
Souvenirs & Postcards (2004)
Photographs (re-released 2006)
The Morning (2006)
Letters to the Editor, Vol. 1 (2007)
Letters to the Editor, Vol. 2 (2008)
Choosing Sides (2009)
Crooked Creek Songs (2010)
Leonard, the Lonely Astronaut (2012)
Heart EP (2015)
Soul EP (2015)
Flesh EP (2015)
Bone EP (2016)
The Painted Desert (2018)

source:

Also appearing on
 Andrew Peterson: Love and Thunder (2003; songwriter and musician)
 Andrew Peterson: Behold the Lamb of God (2004; co-producer, engineer and musician)
 Andrew Peterson: The Far Country (2005; engineer and musician)

References

External links
Resources

American singer-songwriters
American folk singers
American male singer-songwriters
Living people
Place of birth missing (living people)
Year of birth missing (living people)